Richard Stanley Anderson (26 July 1893 – 15 August 1953) was an Australian rules footballer who played with the Williamstown Football Club in the Victorian Football Association (VFA) and with Essendon in the Victorian Football League (VFL).

Family
The son of Robert Anderson (1855-1939), and Sarah Ann Anderson (1869-1955), née Hutchins (later Mrs. Peter Stephens), Richard Stanley Anderson was born at Queenscliff, Victoria on 26 July 1893.

He married Doris Elizabeth Ryan (1891-1969) in 1938.

Military service
He served in the First AIF, suffering severe shell shock after being buried alive in an explosion in France in August 1916. He spent 128 days in hospital but later returned to active service before being discharged in April 1917.

Football

Williamstown (VFA)
He played 45 games (scoring 2 goals) for the Williamstown Football Club over three seasons (1913 to 1915).

Essendon VFL
His only senior match for the Essendon Football Club, was against Fitzroy, at the Brunswick Street Oval on 17 May 1919.

Williamstown (VFA)
He was cleared from Essendon to the Williamstown Football Club in June 1919, and went on to play a further 24 senior games (scoring 2 goals) over three seasons (1919 to 1921).

Death
He died at Middle Park, Victoria on 15 August 1953.

Notes

References
 First World War Embarkation Roll: Private Richard Stanley Anderson (3003), collection of the Australian War Memorial.
 First World War Nominal Roll: Private Richard Stanley Anderson (3003), collection of the Australian War Memorial.
 First World War Service Record: Private Richard Stanley Anderson (3003), National Archives of Australia.
 Funeral Notices: Anderson, The Age, (Monday, 17 August 1953), p.8.
 
 
 Maplestone, M., Flying Higher: History of the Essendon Football Club 1872–1996, Essendon Football Club, (Melbourne), 1996.  -- Note that Maplestone, pp.399, and 460 has Anderson as "S. R. Anderson".

External links 
 
 

1893 births
1953 deaths
Australian military personnel of World War I
Australian rules footballers from Victoria (Australia)
Williamstown Football Club players
Essendon Football Club players